Napoleon is a city in Lafayette County, Missouri, and part of the Kansas City metropolitan area within the United States. The population was 222 at the 2010 census.

History
Napoleon was laid out in 1836, and most likely was named after Napoleon Bonaparte. A post office has been in operation at Napoleon since 1858.

Geography
Napoleon is located at  (39.129800, -94.072099).

Napoleon lies just a few miles west of Wellington, the two towns having been named after the commanders at the Battle of Waterloo. Approximately halfway between the two towns lies a small, unincorporated crossroads called "Waterloo".

Napoleon is located in the northwestern corner of Lafayette County and bordered on the north side by the Missouri River and on the south side by U.S. Route 24 and on the west by Jackson County.

Demographics

2010 census
As of the census of 2010, there were 222 people, 85 households, and 69 families living in the city. The racial makeup of the city was 99.1% White and 0.9% from two or more races. Hispanic or Latino of any race were 0.5% of the population.

There were 85 households, of which 29.4% had children under the age of 18 living with them, 65.9% were married couples living together, 11.8% had a female householder with no husband present, 3.5% had a male householder with no wife present, and 18.8% were non-families. 15.3% of all households were made up of individuals, and 5.9% had someone living alone who was 65 years of age or older. The average household size was 2.61 and the average family size was 2.87.

The median age in the city was 43.8 years. 21.6% of residents were under the age of 18; 9.1% were between the ages of 18 and 24; 21.3% were from 25 to 44; 35.2% were from 45 to 64; and 13.1% were 65 years of age or older. The gender makeup of the city was 49.1% male and 50.9% female.

2000 census
As of the census of 2000, there were 208 people, 86 households, and 63 families living in the city. The population density was 119.3 people per square mile (46.2/km). There were 99 housing units at an average density of 56.8 per square mile (22.0/km). The racial makeup of the city was 94.71% White, 1.92% African American, 0.48% Asian, and 2.88% from two or more races.

There were 86 households, out of which 24.4% had children under the age of 18 living with them, 65.1% were married couples living together, 7.0% had a female householder with no husband present, and 25.6% were non-families. 22.1% of all households were made up of individuals, and 8.1% had someone living alone who was 65 years of age or older. The average household size was 2.42 and the average family size was 2.80.

In the city the population was spread out, with 19.7% under the age of 18, 11.5% from 18 to 24, 22.6% from 25 to 44, 32.7% from 45 to 64, and 13.5% who were 65 years of age or older. The median age was 42 years. For every 100 females, there were 121.3 males. For every 100 females age 18 and over, there were 114.1 males.

The median income for a household in the city was $36,875, and the median income for a family was $45,625. Males had a median income of $36,042 versus $23,036 for females. The per capita income for the city was $17,546. About 9.0% of families and 7.6% of the population were below the poverty line, including 16.2% of those under the age of 18 and none of those 65 or over.

References

Cities in Lafayette County, Missouri
Missouri populated places on the Missouri River
Cities in Missouri